Rafael Batista (born 26 August 1988), better known as Rafael Chorão, is a Brazilian footballer who plays for Operário Ferroviário as a midfielder.

Career
Born in Americana, São Paulo, Rafael began his career in his hometown's Rio Branco and played for a host of clubs, being highlighted on Grêmio Barueri. In December 2012, he signed a contract with Portuguesa.

References

External links

1988 births
Living people
Brazilian footballers
Guaratinguetá Futebol players
Grêmio Barueri Futebol players
Associação Portuguesa de Desportos players
Barretos Esporte Clube players
Botafogo Futebol Clube (SP) players
Clube Atlético Votuporanguense players
People from Americana, São Paulo
Association football midfielders
Footballers from São Paulo (state)